Below are the squads for the 2015 Toulon Tournament. Each team had to submit a maximum of 20 players. Players born no earlier than 1993 are eligible for the tournament.

Players in boldface have been capped at full international level at some point in their career.

Group A

Costa Rica
Coach: Costa Rica Luis Fallas

France
Coach: France Ludovic Batelli

United States
Coach: Andreas Herzog

Netherlands
Coach:Remy Reijnierse

Qatar
Coach:

Group B

China PR
Coach: Fu Bo

England
Coach: Aidy Boothroyd

Ivory Coast
Coach: Ibrahima Camara

Mexico

Coach: Mexico Raúl Gutiérrez

Morocco
Coach:Hassan Benabicha

References

Footnotes

Toulon Tournament squads
Squad